is a Japanese manga series written and illustrated by Uran. It was serialized in Hakusensha's Young Animal Arashi from April 2010 to September 2017. An spin-off, titled Paradise of Innocence Parallel, was serialized in the same magazine from November 2017 to May 2018. The chapters were compiled into thirteen tankōbon volumes.

A 3-episode original animation DVD (OAD) was released from August 2014 to August 2016.

Characters

Media

Manga
Paradise of Innocence is written and illustrated by Uran. It was serialized in Hakusensha's Young Animal Arashi from April 2, 2010 to May 2, 2018. An spin-off, titled , was serialized in Young Animal Arashi from November 2, 2017 to May 2, 2018. Hakusensha compiled its chapters, including Paradise of Innocence Parallel, into thirteen tankōbon volumes, released from February 29, 2012 to July 27, 2018.

Original animation DVD
An original animation DVD (OAD) was bundled with the manga sixth limited-edition volume on August 29, 2014. A second OAD was bundled with the manga eighth limited-edition volume on August 28, 2015. A third and final OAD was bundled with the manga 10th limited-edition volume on August 29, 2016. Hideki Araki directed the first OAD, while Takashi Nishikawa directed the last two OADs at Seven.

Reception
In May 2015, it was announced that the print editions of the manga would be removed from Amazon Japan due to the revised Youth Healthy Development Ordinance laws.

Nicoletta Christina Browne of THEM Anime Reviews gave the OAD 1 out of 5 stars. Browne criticized the series for its content, involving minors in sexual situations, and wrote: "While I could complain more about the crappy art and animation or the stupidity of the concept, that would ultimately give it too much credit. It is twenty-six minutes of watching fifth graders get aroused while being around a pedophile, and that is all you need to know".

References

External links

Hakusensha manga
Seinen manga
Seven (animation studio)
Sex comedy anime and manga